Komatsu Nunatak is a very prominent nunatak rising to  near its center. It was mapped by the United States Geological Survey from surveys and U.S. Navy air photos, 1960–63. The Advisory Committee on Antarctic Names named the nunatak after Stanley K. Komatsu, a United States Antarctic Research Program biologist at McMurdo Station, 1966–67 and 1967–68.

References

Nunataks of Victoria Land
Pennell Coast